Dalmasula is a genus of goblin spiders containing five species occurring in Namibia and South Africa. Males range from 1.7–2.8 mm in length, females 2.2–3.1 mm. The cephalothorax is orange or yellow, and the abdomen is white.

Species
Dalmasula comprises 5 species:
 Dalmasula dodebai Szűts & Ubick, 2012 — South Africa
 Dalmasula griswoldi Szűts & Ubick, 2012 — South Africa
 Dalmasula lorelei Platnick & Dupérré, 2012 (type) — Namibia
 Dalmasula parvimana (Simon, 1910) — Namibia
 Dalmasula tsumkwe Platnick & Dupérré, 2012 — Namibia

References

Oonopidae
Spiders of Africa
Araneomorphae genera